is the ninth single by Japanese singer Yōko Oginome. Written by Hiromi Mori and Nobody, the single was released on June 10, 1986 by Victor Entertainment.

Background and release
"Dance Beat wa Yoake made" was used as the opening theme of the TBS drama series , which starred Oginome as the lead character .

The music video features Oginome as a maiden dancing in a lakeside forest. At the end of a video, she sees a door in the middle of the forest and opens it, only to be blinded by the light emitting from the other side of the door.

"Dance Beat wa Yoake made" peaked at No. 4 on Oricon's singles chart and sold over 148,000 copies.

In 1991, Oginome re-recorded the song in a Flamenco style, titled ; this version was released in the remix album New Take: Best Collections '92.

Track listing

Charts

Year-end charts

References

External links

1986 singles
Yōko Oginome songs
Japanese-language songs
Japanese television drama theme songs
Victor Entertainment singles